Macrochaeta natalensis is a polychaete which belongs to the Acrocirridae family. The body of this worm consists of a head, a cylindrical, segmented body and a tail piece. The head consists of a prostomium (part of the mouth's opening) and a peristomium (area around the mouth) and utilized paired appendages (palps, antennae and cirri).

The scientific name of this species was first published in 1996 by Hartmann-Schröder

References

Terebellida
Animals described in 1996